Dolní Heřmanice is a municipality and village in Žďár nad Sázavou District in the Vysočina Region of the Czech Republic. It has about 500 inhabitants.

Administrative parts
The village of Oslava is an administrative part of Dolní Heřmanice.

Notable people
Karel Dufek (1916–2009), diplomat and Spanish Civil War veteran

References

Villages in Žďár nad Sázavou District